Christine Goodwin v. United Kingdom is a case decided by the European Court of Human Rights on 11 July 2002. The applicant, Christine Goodwin, a United Kingdom national born in 1937, was a male to female transsexual. She claimed that she had problems and faced sexual harassment at work during and following her Sex reassignment surgery. She also alleged that the fact that she kept the same National Insurance number meant that her employer had been able to discover that she previously worked for them under another name and sex, with resulting embarrassment and humiliation.

Complaints 
Relying on Articles 8, 12, 13 and 14 of the Convention, the applicant complained about her treatment in relation to employment, social security and pensions and her inability to marry.

Judgement 
ECtHR found a violation of Article 8 (right to respect for private and family life) of the European Convention on Human Rights; a violation of Article 12 (right to marry and to found a family); and did not find a violation of Article 13 (right to an effective remedy). It found that no separate issue had arisen under Article 14 (prohibition of discrimination).

Reasoning 
No concrete or substantial hardship or detriment to the public interest had been demonstrated as likely to flow from any change to the status of transgender people. Society might reasonably be expected to tolerate a certain inconvenience to enable individuals to live in dignity and worth in accordance with the gender/sex identity. It concluded that the fair balance that was inherent in the Convention now tilted decisively in favour of the applicant. There had, accordingly, been a failure to respect her right to private life in breach of Article 8. The Court also found no justification for barring the individual due to her being transgender from enjoying the right to marry under any circumstances. It concluded that there had been a breach of Article 12. The case-law of the Convention institutions indicated that Article 13 could not be interpreted as requiring a remedy against the state of domestic law. In the circumstances no breach of Article 13 arose. The lack of legal recognition of the change of gender of a transgender person laid at the heart of the applicant's complaints under Article 14 of the Convention and had been examined under Article 8 so there was no separate issue arose under Article 14.

Reception 
The government's loss of the Goodwin case was a factor in the introduction of the Gender Recognition Act 2004.

References

European Court of Human Rights cases involving the United Kingdom
European Court of Human Rights case law on LGBT rights
United Kingdom LGBT rights case law
Transgender case law in the United Kingdom
Harassment case law
2002 in LGBT history